Joseph Daniel Early (January 31, 1933 – November 9, 2012) was an American politician. He represented the third district of Massachusetts in the U.S. House of Representatives from 1975 to 1993.

Early was born in Worcester, Massachusetts on January 31, 1933. He attended parochial schools in Worcester, and received a B.S. degree from College of the Holy Cross, graduating in 1955. He served in United States Navy, 1955–1957. He then taught high school in Shrewsbury and Spencer.

Early served six terms in the Massachusetts House of Representatives from 1963 to 1974. He was a delegate to Massachusetts State Democratic conventions from 1964 to 1970, and was elected as a Democrat to the 94th and to the eight succeeding Congresses (January 3, 1975 – January 3, 1993). He lost re-election in 1992 to Republican Peter I. Blute, in part due to the House banking scandal. He died on November 9, 2012. His son, Joseph Early, Jr. today serves as the Worcester County District Attorney.

References

External links

 

1933 births
2012 deaths
Democratic Party members of the Massachusetts House of Representatives
Politicians from Worcester, Massachusetts
Holy Cross Crusaders men's basketball players
College of the Holy Cross alumni
United States Navy sailors
Democratic Party members of the United States House of Representatives from Massachusetts
20th-century American politicians
American men's basketball players